Breda is a given name and a surname which may refer to:

Surname
 Carl Frederik von Breda (1759–1818), Swedish painter
 David Breda (born 1971), Czech former footballer
 David Breda (footballer, born 1996), Czech footballer
 Ernesto Breda, Italian engineer and industrialist, founder of Società Italiana Ernesto Breda, an Italian manufacturing company
 François Bréda (1956–2018), Romanian essayist, poet, literary critic and literary historian
 Giovanni Battista Breda (1931–1992), Italian fencer
 Lurdes Breda (born 1970), Portuguese writer
 Roberto Breda (born 1969), Italian football coach and former player
 Toussaint Bréda, better known as Toussaint Louverture (1743–1803), leader of the Haitian Revolution
 William Breda (born 1927), American baseball player in the Negro leagues

Given name
 Breda Beban (1952–2012), Serbian filmmaker and artist
 Breda O'Brien (born 1962), Irish teacher and newspaper columnist
 Breda Pergar, Yugoslav distance runner
 Breda Smolnikar (born 1941), Slovene writer

See also
 Van Breda, a surname